Jenny Jay (born Jennifer Bolton on 18 November 1967 in Birmingham), is a British actress, who played Carmen in Carla Lane's television series Bread. She has also appeared in such programmes as Behind The Bike Sheds, The Bill, KYTV, Alas Smith and Jones, All Creatures Great and Small, Inspector Morse and the 80s children's drama series, Dodger, Bonzo and the Rest.

Biography 
Born as Jenny Bolton and who was also known as Jenny Jay, has been involved in the music business and performing since a very early age - entering talent contest at Butlins Holiday Camps and winning several holidays for the family.
 
Jenny's passion for singing and performing began at an early age; she won her first competition when she was 5 years old as well as appearing on Opportunity Knocks. At 7 years of age she sang at the London Hilton Cabaret Spot. Moving to London at this time made it possible for Jenny to go to the prestigious Italia Conti Academy of Theatre Arts and later attend the Sylvia Young Theatre School.

During her teens she appeared in two ITV dramas, Dodger, Bonzo and the Rest and two series of Behind The Bike Sheds. She also appeared on the Russell Harty Show performing an act with a ventriloquist doll of then Prime Minister Margaret Thatcher.

An appearance in  controversial BBC gay-themed drama, Two of Us led to musician Morrissey casting Jenny in the video for his single 
Dagenham Dave.

Many television roles followed, most prominently two series as Carmen in Carla Lane's Liverpool sitcom Bread.

During 1996 Jenny spent a year on L!VE TV's low budget series Canary Wharf.

She is also a full-time mum.

Music 

In 1987 Jenny featured alongside Paul McCartney, Boy George, Bananarama, Kim Wilde, Nik Kershaw and many others as part of the line up for Ferry Aid on the charity single Let It be in aid of the Zeebrugge Herald of Free Enterprise disaster.

In 1989 Jenny performed backing vocals during the Italian tour of soul group Imagination. She also worked with James Brown’s backing band at a club in Georgia, USA.

Over the years Jenny has appeared at venues spanning the country from The Zap Club in Brighton to The Fubar in Scotland.

Jay was also part of hardcore music group Triple J as well as having a solo career as Jenka, and also her real name, Jennifer Bolton.

References

External links 
 Official Jennifer Bolton Web Site
 Artist profile at Just Another Label

English dance musicians
English women singers
English television actresses
Living people
People from Birmingham, West Midlands
1967 births